Kharaji or Kheraji may refer to:
 Kharaji, Chaharmahal and Bakhtiari
 Kharaji, Hormozgan